I Met Him in Paris is a 1937 film made by Paramount Pictures, directed by Wesley Ruggles, written by Claude Binyon, and starring Claudette Colbert, Melvyn Douglas, and Robert Young.

It was the first film shown at Washington, D.C.'s Newton Theater when it opened in the Brookland neighborhood on July 29, 1937.

Cast
 Claudette Colbert as Kay Denham 
 Melvyn Douglas as George Potter 
 Robert Young as Gene Anders 
 Lee Bowman as Berk Sutter 
 Mona Barrie as Helen Anders 
 George Davis as Cutter Driver 
 Fritz Feld as Hotel Clerk 
 Rudolph Anders as Romantic Waiter 
 Alexander Cross as John Hanley 
 George Sorel as Hotel Clerk 
 Louis LaBey as a Bartender 
 Egon Brecher as Emile, Upper Tower Man 
 Hans Joby as the Lower Tower Man 
 Jacques Vanaire as the  French Masher 
 Eugene Borden as a Headwaiter

See also 
 1937 in film

References

External links 
 
 
 

1937 films
1937 romantic comedy films
1930s screwball comedy films
American black-and-white films
American romantic comedy films
American screwball comedy films
Films directed by Wesley Ruggles
Films set in Paris
Films set in Switzerland
Films shot in Sun Valley, Idaho
Paramount Pictures films
1930s English-language films
1930s American films